Shuvee (January 22, 1966 – April 1, 1986) was an American Thoroughbred Champion Hall of Fame racehorse.

Background
Shuvee was a chestnut mare bred in Virginia by Whitney A. Stone. She was sired by 1955 Horse of the Year Nashua out of the 1956 Coaching Club American Oaks winner Levee.

Racing career
Shuvee was the second filly to ever win the U.S. Filly Triple Crown.

In addition to winning the Triple Tiara, in 1970 Shuvee became the only filly to ever defeat colts in the two-mile-long Jockey Club Gold Cup. Future Hall of Fame jockey Ron Turcotte (and 1973 Triple Crown winner aboard Secretariat) guided her to a seven-length repeat victory in that race in 1971.

Breeding record
As a broodmare, she had only modest success.

Honors
Shuvee was named American Champion Older Female Horse in 1970 and 1971.

In 1975, Shuvee was inducted into the National Museum of Racing and Hall of Fame, where her portrait by equine artist Richard Stone Reeves can be seen in the Museum's collection. On its creation in 1977, she was voted into the Aiken Thoroughbred Racing Hall of Fame and Museum.

Pedigree

References
 Shuvee at the United States National Museum of Racing and Hall of Fame
 Shuvee's pedigree and racing stats

1966 racehorse births
1986 racehorse deaths
Racehorses bred in Virginia
Racehorses trained in the United States
Triple Crown of Thoroughbred Racing winners
United States Thoroughbred Racing Hall of Fame inductees
Thoroughbred family 9-f